The Arena Naucalpan 40th Anniversary Show was a major annual professional wrestling event produced by Mexican professional wrestling promotion International Wrestling Revolution Group (IWRG), which took place on December 17, 2017 in Arena Naucalpan, Naucalpan, State of Mexico, Mexico. The show celebrated the 40th Anniversary of the construction of Arena Naucalpan, IWRG's main venue.

The main event was supposed to be Oficial Rayan facing off against Black Dragón in a Lucha de Apuestas, mask vs. mask match, but Rayan fractured his foot in the week prior to the show. He chose Oficial Spector to replace him in the match, leading to Spector winning the match, forcing Black Dragón to unmask and state his given name, Jared Anciniega Lopez as per lucha libre traditions. In the semi-main event two generations of Los Villanos teamed up as Ray Mendoza Jr., Rokambole Jr., Villano IV, and Villano V Jr. defeated Mr. Electro, Sharly Rockstar, Trauma I, and Trauma II. The show included five additional matches.

Production

Background
Promoter Adolfo Moreno had promoted Lucha Libre, or professional wrestling in Naucalpan, State of Mexico, Mexico prior to financing the building of Arena Naucalpan that opened in late 1976. Originally Moreno worked together with the Universal Wrestling Association (UWA) and then later Consejo Mundial de Lucha Libre (CMLL) as a local promoter. On January 1, 1996 Moreno created International Wrestling Revolution Group (IWRG) as an independent promotion. IWRG celebrates the anniversary of Arena Naucalpan each year in December with a major show, making it the second oldest, still promoted show series in the world. pre-dating WrestleMania by eight years. Only the CMLL Anniversary Show series has a longer history. The 2017 Arena Naucalpan anniversary show marked the 40th Anniversary of Arena Naucalpan. The Anniversary shows, as well as the majority of the IWRG shows in general are held in Arena Naucalpan.

Storylines
The Arena Naucalpan 40th Anniversary Show featured a total of five professional wrestling matches with different wrestlers involved in pre-existing scripted feuds, plots and storylines. Wrestlers portrayed themselves as either heels (referred to as rudos in Mexico, those that portray the "bad guys") or faces (técnicos in Mexico, the "good guy" characters) as they followed a series of tension-building events, which culminated in a wrestling match or series of matches.

Event
La Dinastia Imperial ("The Imperiall Dynasty"; (brothers Ray Mendoza Jr. and Villano IV, and brothers Rokambole Jr. and Villano V Jr.) faced off against two sets of brothers in Mr. Electro and Sharly Rockstar (The Luna brothers) and Los Traumas (Trauma I and Trauma II) in an eight-man tag team match in the semi-main event of the show. Mr. Electro accidentally struck one of the Traumas, leading to La Dinastia Imperial scoring the deciding pinfall and victory. After the match the Luna brothers and Los Traumas argued about who was at fault for the loss, threatening each other.

The main event had been promoted as a Lucha de Apuestas, or bet match, where both Oficial Rayan and Black Dragón for their wrestling masks, but in the week leading up to the show Oficial Rayan fractured his foot and was unable to compete with his foot in a cast. IWRG announced that Oficial Rayan had to choose one of this tag team partners from Los Oficiales Elite, either Oficial Spector or Oficial Liderk, to take his place in the match. Rayan picked Oficial Spector, who had to risk his mask instead. With Rayan's help, Oficial Spector was able to defeat Black Dragón. After the match, Black Dragón unmasked, revealed that his real name was Jared Arciniega Lopez, from Mexico City and despite being only 18 years old had been a professional wrestler for four years at the time.

Results

References

External links 
IWRG official website

2017 in professional wrestling
2017 in Mexico
Arena Naucalpan Anniversary Show
December 2017 events in Mexico